Han Bing (born 21 December 1969) is a Chinese ice dancer. She competed in the ice dance event at the 1992 Winter Olympics.

References

1969 births
Living people
Chinese female ice dancers
Olympic figure skaters of China
Figure skaters at the 1992 Winter Olympics
Place of birth missing (living people)